Elizabeth Lucas (born May 1835) was a Union nurse during the American Civil War.

Early life 
Lucas was born in Darlington, Ontario in May 1835. Both her maternal and paternal grandparents were settlers in Connecticut and served in the American Revolution under George Washington, allegedly crossing the Delaware with him.

On September 28, 1852, Lucas married William Lucas. The couple later moved to Michigan.

Civil War Service
Of the pair, Lucas's husband enlisted first on January 5, 1864, in the 4th Michigan Cavalry. In the fall of that year, when the regiment was in Louisville for recruitment, William Lucas fell ill and Elizabeth Lucas went to care for him. When the regiment left for the front, Lucas followed. In January of the following year, Lucas served at the Brown Hospital in the linen room. When her husband later broke his leg, she had him transferred to Brown Hospital so she could monitor his care. Lucas's daughter also worked with her, but as she was too young to be a nurse, she served exclusively in the linen room.

After the war 
Brown Hospital eventually was broken up, and Lucas was discharged in August 1865 after three years of service and moved to a farm in Swan Creek, Michigan.  She received a pension for her service.

References 

Women in the American Civil War
People from Michigan
1835 births
Year of death missing
American Civil War nurses
American women nurses
Pre-Confederation Canadian emigrants to the United States
People from Clarington